Willisau (Quartet) 1991 is a 4CD box set by American composer and saxophonist Anthony Braxton recorded live and in the studio in 1991 and released on the hatART label.

Reception
The Allmusic review by Thom Jurek awarded the album 4½ stars stating "With this band, he never had to assert himself as a leader because they could instinctively follow his cues. Since that time, he has had to assert himself more and more. And while the music he's writing has every bit of the wonder, awe, and irritation of his earlier work, it has never been played with this virtuosity".

Track listing
All compositions by Anthony Braxton
Disc One: 
 "No. 160(+5) +40j" - 13:22 
 "No. 23 M (+10)" - 16:02 
 "No. 158 (+96) +40l" - 17:28 
 "No. 40a" - 13:29 
 "No. 40b" - 11:34 
Disc Two: 
 "No. 161" - 17:22 
 "No. 159" - 17:04 
 "No. 23c +32 +105b (+30)" - 9:10 
 "No. 23 M (+10)" - 13:46 
 "No. 40m" - 12:03 
Disc Three:
 "No. 67 (+147+96)" - 15:03 
 "No. 140 (+147 +139 + 135)" - 17:04 
 "No. 34a" - 8:24 
 "No. 20+86" - 12:13 
 "No. 23g (+147+30)" - 5:55 
Disc Four: 
 "No. 69 (0) + 135" - 12:47 
 "No. 69b" - 23:48 
 "No. 107b (+96)" - 10:27 
 "No. 101" - 12:02 
Recorded at Mohren in Willisau, Switzerland on June 2 (Disc Three and Four) and June 4 & 5 (Disc One and Two), 1991

Personnel
Anthony Braxton - sopranino saxophone, alto saxophone, clarinet, flute
Marilyn Crispell - piano
Mark Dresser - bass
Gerry Hemingway - drums, marimba

References

Hathut Records albums
Anthony Braxton albums
Anthony Braxton live albums
1992 albums